Harold Bertram Walden (22 December 1940 – 23 September 2018) was an English professional footballer.

Career

Walden started out with Kettering Town, before signing for Luton Town in 1961. After playing 106 times for Luton in all competitions, he moved on to Northampton Town in 1964, where he made 76 league appearances in three years. In 1967, Walden returned to Kettering. He also played and scored many goals for team gb

References

1940 births
2018 deaths
English footballers
English Football League players
Kettering Town F.C. players
Luton Town F.C. players
Northampton Town F.C. players
Association football midfielders
People from West Northamptonshire District